Ozzy Osbourne Live EP is a live EP released by Ozzy Osbourne in 1980. The EP contains live versions of the songs "Mr. Crowley", "Suicide Solution" and "You Said It All", all performed at a 1980 Southampton performance.

The original 1980 European pressing simply called the EP Mr. Crowley Live, named after the A-side.

Overview
After performing a show in Birmingham, the band hastily returned to Ridge Farm Studio to remix the song "Goodbye to Romance" for an anticipated single release. The next morning they were informed that Jet Records wanted a new song to release instead as a single. Rhoads, Daisley, and Kerslake quickly put together the song "You Said It All", with drummer Kerslake performing the guide vocal at soundcheck while a drunken Osbourne slept under the drum riser. The plans to release "You Said It All" as a single were later scrapped for unknown reasons, and this live version is the only known recording.

Track listing
All tracks by Ozzy Osbourne, Randy Rhoads and Bob Daisley unless noted.

Personnel
Ozzy Osbourne – vocals
Randy Rhoads – guitar
Bob Daisley – bass
Lee Kerslake – drums
Lindsay Bridgwater – keyboards

Charts

References

1980 debut EPs
1980 live albums
Albums produced by Max Norman
Heavy metal EPs
Live EPs
Ozzy Osbourne live albums
Randy Rhoads